"Breast Cancer Show Ever" is the ninth episode in the twelfth season of the American animated television series South Park, and the 176th episode of the series overall. It originally aired on Comedy Central in the United States on October 15, 2008. The episode was written and directed by series co-creator Trey Parker. In the episode, Cartman's disrespectful behavior puts him on the wrong side of Wendy Testaburger when he mocks her presentation on breast cancer awareness, which leads to Wendy threatening to beat Cartman up after school.  The episode was rated TV-MA L in the United States.

Plot
During Wendy Testaburger's presentation on breast cancer awareness, Eric Cartman mocks her efforts, with Mr. Garrison doing very little to stop him. After class, Cartman continues to mock her efforts for breast cancer awareness, and Wendy announces she will fight Cartman after school. Butters Stotch rallies his classmates, including Bebe, who alerts her peers in the girls' bathroom; Ike reports it to the kindergarten students, and Red does likewise to the Goth Kids.

This only makes Cartman frightened and reluctant after hearing Butters say that he will be rejected by his peers if a girl beats him up. Cartman tries to call off the fight with quiet apologies (attempting to keep the rest of the school from hearing it and pretending that he is brave and "hardcore", in order to avoid being called a coward), bribery, and desperate claims. When Wendy tells him "I'm going to shove your ass down your throat and make you eat your underwear", he chokes down his underwear, attempting to appease her, but this only disgusts and angers her.

Cartman tries to convince Stan Marsh to talk Wendy out of it, but Stan does not believe he can do anything to stop her. Desperate to avoid the fight, Cartman defecates on Mr. Garrison's desk in order to get detention. Butters, Craig, and Jimmy tell him there are rumors that he deliberately got detention to avoid the fight, and that they rescheduled the fight for the following morning before school.

Later, Cartman plays the victim by having his mother convince Wendy's parents to forbid her from fighting him by pretending to be tormented and bullied by her at school, and she reluctantly concedes. Instead of letting up, Cartman continues to taunt her, making faces at her and giving her the finger, shocking and enraging Wendy, who knows that she can no longer fight back lest her parents find out, and the other students start following Cartman's example. The next day, Cartman shows up before school and mocks her knowing that she will not fight due to him reporting to his mother. He also takes the opportunity to call her names like “chicken”, in attempts to make people think that she is a coward. When Cartman gives a mock presentation on breast cancer in class to rub her face in his victory, she nearly fights him but is called to Principal Victoria's office. Surprisingly, Principal Victoria commends Wendy for all she has done to spread awareness of breast cancer, and explains that she is a breast cancer survivor herself. She tells Wendy that "Cancer does not play by the rules", adding that it is "a fat little lump that needs to be destroyed", and "you refuse to let that fat little lump make you feel powerless." Realizing that Cartman will never stop of his own will, and with Principal Victoria's support, Wendy decides to fight him.

Wendy then meets Cartman on the playground for the fight, and Cartman makes final efforts to escape the situation, but he eventually gives in and decides to fight.  Although Cartman briefly gains the upper hand, Wendy soon emerges victorious with only a few bruises, while leaving Cartman bruised, bloody, and having knocked out many of his teeth. The other students cheer her and Cartman bursts into tears in front of everybody. He declares that his friends will not find him cool any more, but the students tell him they never thought of him as cool, and have always hated him and always will, stating that they cannot possibly think any less of him. Cartman misinterprets this as them pretending to not think differently about him in order to make him feel better, reasoning that if they are trying to make him feel better, they do not care if a girl beat him up. He walks away happy, confusing the others.

Cultural references 
The plot of the episode is loosely based on the film Three O'Clock High. The fight scene is also based on that of the film Snatch and references the ending scene of There Will Be Blood. In the DVD commentary, Parker and Matt Stone refer to the character's interactions in the episode as thematically similar to the cartoon show Peanuts and "kids being kids.".

Literary references 
While Cartman awaits the fight in class, Mr. Garrison says, "So you see, at this point Euripides knew he could not win the battle", referencing The Frogs, a comedic play by Aristophanes where the Greek tragedians Euripides and Aeschylus are measured against one another, the better to be revived so he can "educate the thoughtless" and rid Athens of evil politicians that are ruining the city (1500–1502, The Frogs).

Reception
The episode received mostly positive reviews. The A.V. Club graded the episode a B+, stating "All in all, not the most ambitious episode, but that actually worked in its favor: Outside of Wendy's crib from There Will Be Blood at the end, it could have been broadcast 10 years ago and worked, and I also have a feeling it will still be funny 10 years from now since it wasn't crammed with instantly dated references". IGN gave the episode an 8.2/10 rating, stating "While this is a fun sequence, and a nice bit of observation, the episode does seem somewhat anticlimactic. It's amusing that Cartman thinks he somehow achieved something when he finds out the kids always thought he sucked and their opinion of him 'couldn't possibly be any lower'. Massive self delusion is part of Cartman's 'charm'. But the episode is unusually focused for South Park and once the fight is over there's a sense (perhaps intentionally?) of 'that's it?' It's not one of the best episodes ever, but it's a solid old-school installment that offers up some truly great moments – many of them quintessential Cartman. Which is always fun to watch".

Home release
"Breast Cancer Show Ever", along with the thirteen other episodes from South Park'''s twelfth season, were released on a three-disc DVD set and two-disc Blu-ray set in the United States on March 10, 2009. The sets included brief audio commentaries by Parker and Stone for each episode, a collection of deleted scenes, and two special mini-features, The Making of 'Major Boobage and Six Days to South Park''.

References

External links 

 "Breast Cancer Show Ever" Full episode at South Park Studios
 

South Park (season 12) episodes
Breast cancer
Television episodes about bullying